Zhuzhai (朱寨镇) may refer to the following locations in China:

 Zhuzhai, Anhui
 Zhuzhai, Jiangsu, town in Pei County